The Tenth Dynasty of ancient Egypt (Dynasty X) is often combined with the 7th, 8th, 9th and early 11th Dynasties under the group title First Intermediate Period.

Rulers 
The 9th Dynasty was founded at Herakleopolis Magna, and the 10th Dynasty continued there. At this time Egypt was not unified, and there is some overlap between these and other local dynasties. The Turin Canon lists eighteen kings for this royal line, but their names are damaged, unidentifiable, or lost.

The following is a possible list of rulers of the Tenth Dynasty based on the Turin Canon, as Egyptologists have differing opinions about the order of succession within the two dynasties. Among them, only Wahkare Khety and Merykare are undoubtedly attested by archaeological finds:

References 

 
States and territories established in the 3rd millennium BC
States and territories disestablished in the 3rd millennium BC
10
3rd millennium BC in Egypt
21st century BC in Egypt
3rd-millennium BC establishments in Egypt
3rd-millennium BC disestablishments in Egypt